This article details the 2010–11 UEFA Europa League qualifying phase and play-off round.

Each tie was played over two legs, with each team playing one leg at home. The team that had the higher aggregate score over the two legs progressed to the next round. In the event that aggregate scores finished level, the away goals rule was applied; i.e., the team that scored more goals away from home over the two legs progressed. If away goals were also equal, then 30 minutes of extra time was played, divided into two 15-minute halves. The away goals rule was again applied after extra time; i.e., if there were goals scored during extra time and the aggregate score was still level, the visiting team qualified by virtue of more away goals scored. If no goals were scored during extra time, the tie was decided by a penalty shootout.

All times are CEST (UTC+2)

Round and draw dates
All draws were held at UEFA headquarters in Nyon, Switzerland.

Matches may also be played on Tuesdays or Wednesdays instead of the regular Thursdays due to scheduling conflicts.

Teams
Below are the 160 teams involved in the qualifying phase and play-off round, grouped by their starting rounds. The 37 winners of the play-off round qualified for the group stage to join the 10 losing teams from the Champions League play-off round, and the title holders, Atlético Madrid.

In each round, teams were seeded based on their 2010 UEFA club coefficients. Prior to the draw, UEFA may form "groups" in accordance with the principles set by the Club Competitions Committee, but they are purely for convenience of the draw and do not resemble any real groupings in the sense of the competition, while ensuring that teams from the same association not drawn against each other.

CL-c Losing teams from the Champions League third qualifying round (Champions Path)

CL-n Losing teams from the Champions League third qualifying round (Non-Champions Path)

First qualifying round

Seeding

Matches

|}
Note 1: Order of legs reversed after original draw.

First leg

Notes
Note 2: Played in Durrës at the Stadiumi Niko Dovana as Laçi's Stadiumi Laçi did not meet UEFA criteria.
Note 3: Played in Tallinn at the Lilleküla Stadium as Narva Trans's Narva Kreenholmi Stadium did not meet UEFA criteria.
Note 4: Played in Tirana at the Qemal Stafa Stadium as KF Tirana's Selman Stërmasi Stadium did not meet UEFA criteria.
Note 5: Played in Nikšić at the Stadion Gradski as Zeta's Trešnjica Stadium did not meet UEFA criteria.
Note 6: Played in Chișinău at the Zimbru Stadium as Olimpia's Olimpia Bălți Stadium did not meet UEFA criteria.
Note 7: Played in Baku at the Tofiq Bahramov Stadium as Qarabağ's Guzanli Olympic Stadium did not meet UEFA criteria.
Note 8: Played in Dugopolje at Stadion Hrvatski vitezovi as Šibenik's Stadion Šubićevac did not meet UEFA criteria.
Note 9: Played in Andorra la Vella at the Camp d'Esports del M.I. Consell General as the grass in Estadi Comunal d'Andorra la Vella was being replaced. This grass replacement led to the 3–0 loss awarded to FC Santa Coloma on the first leg of the UEFA Champions League first qualifying round against Birkirkara.
Note 10: Played in Luxembourg City at the Stade Josy Barthel as Grevenmacher's Op Flohr Stadion did not meet UEFA criteria.
Note 11: Played in Tórshavn at the Gundadalur as NSÍ Runavík's Runavík Stadium did not meet UEFA criteria.
Note 12: Played in Domžale at the Sports Park as Olimpija Ljubljana's ŽŠD Ljubljana Stadium did not meet UEFA criteria.

Second leg

Anorthosis won 4–0 on aggregate.

Tauras Tauragė won 5–4 on aggregate.

Qarabağ won 5–2 on aggregate.

Mogren won 5–0 on aggregate.

Šibenik won 3–0 on aggregate.

Dinamo Tbilisi won 2–1 on aggregate.

1–1 on aggregate. Olimpia won on away goals.

Bnei Yehuda won 1–0 on aggregate.

Portadown won 2–1 on aggregate.

MYPA won 7–0 on aggregate.

Dnepr Mogilev won 8–2 on aggregate.

Randers won 7–3 on aggregate.

1–1 on aggregate. Dacia won on away goals.

Győri ETO won 5–3 on aggregate.

KF Tirana won 1–0 on aggregate.

Gefle won 4–1 on aggregate.

Rabotnički won 11–0 on aggregate.

TPS won 7–1 on aggregate.

Zrinjski won 4–2 on aggregate.

Dundalk won 5–4 on aggregate.

Kalmar FF won 4–0 on aggregate.

Široki Brijeg won 5–0 on aggregate.

Zestafoni won 5–0 on aggregate.

KR Reykjavík won 5–2 on aggregate.

Ruch Chorzów won 3–1 on aggregate.

Torpedo Zhodino won 6–1 on aggregate.

Notes
Note 13: Played in Kaunas at S. Darius and S. Girėnas Stadium as Tauras Tauragė's Vytautas Stadium did not meet UEFA criteria.
Note 14: Played in Skopje at Philip II Arena as Metalurg Skopje's Železarnica Stadium did not meet UEFA criteria.
Note 15: Played in Nikšić at Stadion Gradski as Mogren's Stadion Mogren did not meet UEFA criteria.
Note 16: Played in Chişinău at Zimbru Stadium as Dacia's Dinamo Stadium did not meet UEFA criteria.
Note 17: Played in Solna at Råsunda Stadium as Gefle's Strömvallen did not meet UEFA criteria.
Note 18: Played in Toftir at Svangaskarð as EB/Streymur's Við Margáir did not meet UEFA criteria.
Note 19: Played in Reykjavík at Laugardalsvöllur as Fylkir's Fylkisvöllur did not meet UEFA criteria.

Second qualifying round

Seeding

*Unseeded teams from the first qualifying round that qualified for the second qualifying round, effectively taking the coefficient and seeding of their first qualifying round opponents in this draw.

Matches

|}

Notes
Note 20: Order of legs reversed after original draw.
Note 21: Original match abandoned in the 80th minute due to adverse weather conditions, with MYPA leading 1–0. The match was replayed on 23 July 2010 at 18:30 CEST from the beginning.
Note 22: UEFA awarded Győri ETO a 3–0 win due to Atyrau fielding a suspended player in the first leg. The original match had ended in a 2–0 win for Győri ETO.
Note 23: UEFA awarded Budućnost Podgorica a 3–0 win due to Baku fielding a suspended player in the first leg. The original match had ended in a 2–1 win for Baku.

First leg

Notes
Note 24: Played in Tbilisi at Boris Paichadze Stadium as WIT Georgia's Shevardeni Stadium did not meet UEFA criteria.
Note 25: Played in Kaunas at S. Darius and S. Girėnas Stadium as Tauras Tauragė's Vytautas stadium did not meet UEFA criteria.
Note 26: Played in Chișinău at Zimbru Stadium as Olimpia's Olimpia Bălți Stadium did not meet UEFA criteria.
Note 27: Played in Vantaa at ISS Stadion as Honka's Tapiolan Urheilupuisto did not meet UEFA criteria.
Note 28: Played in Solna at Råsunda Stadium as Gefle's Strömvallen did not meet UEFA criteria.
Note 29: Played in Luxembourg City at Stade Josy Barthel as Differdange's Stade du Thillenberg did not meet UEFA criteria.
Note 30: Played in Ghent at Jules Ottenstadion as Cercle Brugge's Jan Breydel Stadium is undergoing renovative work.
Note 31: Played in Győr at ETO Park as Videoton's Stadion Sóstói did not meet UEFA criteria.
Note 32: Played in Tirana at Qemal Stafa Stadium as Besa Kavajë's Stadiumi Besa did not meet UEFA criteria.
Note 33: Played in Funchal at Estádio da Madeira as Marítimo's Estádio dos Barreiros is undergoing extensive renovative work.
Note 34: Played in Belfast at Windsor Park as Cliftonville's Solitude did not meet UEFA criteria.

Second leg

Rabotnički won 1–0 on aggregate.

Teteks won 3–1 on aggregate.

OFK Beograd won 3–2 on aggregate.

Zestafoni won 3–1 on aggregate.

Maccabi Tel Aviv won 3–2 on aggregate.

Spartak Zlatibor Voda won 5–3 on aggregate.

Qarabağ won 3–2 on aggregate.

2–2 on aggregate. Cercle Brugge won on away goals.

3–3 on aggregate. Dnepr Mogilev won on away goals.

Austria Wien won 3–2 on aggregate.

2–2 on aggregate. Molde won on away goals.

Baník Ostrava won 6–0 on aggregate.

Dinamo Minsk won 10–1 on aggregate.

Karpaty Lviv won 6–2 on aggregate.

Kalmar FF won 2–0 on aggregate.

Replay:

MYPA won 8–0 on aggregate.

Dinamo Tbilisi won 4–2 on aggregate.

Randers won 4–1 on aggregate.

Elfsborg won 3–1 on aggregate.

APOEL won 6–1 on aggregate.

Utrecht won 5–1 on aggregate.

Shamrock Rovers won 2–1 on aggregate.

Dinamo București won 7–1 on aggregate.

Anorthosis won 3–2 on aggregate.

Wisła won 7–0 on aggregate.

Brøndby won 3–0 on aggregate.

Levski Sofia won 8–0 on aggregate.

Beşiktaş won 7–0 on aggregate.

1–1 on aggregate. Ruch won on away goals.

Rapid Wien won 6–2 on aggregate.

Maribor won 3–1 on aggregate.

Bangor City won 3–2 on aggregate.

Győri ETO won 5–0 on aggregate.

Zrinjski won 13–3 on aggregate.

Olympiacos won 11–1 on aggregate.

Lausanne-Sport won 2–1 on aggregate.

Marítimo won 6–4 on aggregate.

Cliftonville won 1–0 on aggregate.

Budućnost Podgorica won 4–2 on aggregate.

Motherwell won 2–0 on aggregate.

Notes
Note 35: Played in Skopje at Philip II Arena as Teteks's City Stadium Tetovo did not meet UEFA criteria.
Note 36: Played in Barysaw at Haradski Stadium as Torpedo Zhodino's Torpedo Stadium did not meet UEFA criteria.
Note 37: Played in Nikšić at Stadion Gradski as Mogren's Stadion Mogren did not meet UEFA criteria.
Note 38: Played in Novi Sad at Karađorđe Stadium as Spartak Zlatibor Voda's Subotica City Stadium did not meet UEFA criteria.
Note 39: Played in Baku at Tofiq Bahramov Stadium as Qarabağ's Guzanli Olympic Stadium did not meet UEFA criteria.
Note 40: Played in Jūrmala at Slokas Stadium as Jelgava's Ozolnieku Stadions did not meet UEFA criteria.
Note 41: Played in Tallinn at Lilleküla Stadium as Sillamäe Kalev's Sillamäe Kalevi Stadium did not meet UEFA criteria.
Note 42: Played in Chişinău at Zimbru Stadium as Dacia's Dinamo Stadium did not meet UEFA criteria.
Note 43: Played in Tiraspol at Sheriff Stadium as Iskra-Stal's Orăşenesc Stadium did not meet UEFA criteria.
Note 44: Played in Tirana at Qemal Stafa Stadium as KF Tirana's Selman Stërmasi stadium did not meet UEFA criteria.
Note 45: Played in Split at Stadion Poljud as Šibenik's Stadion Šubićevac did not meet UEFA criteria.
Note 46: Played in Toftir at Svangaskarð as Víkingur Gøta's Serpugerði Stadium did not meet UEFA criteria.
Note 47: Played in Wrexham at Racecourse Ground as Bangor City's Farrar Road Stadium did not meet UEFA criteria.
Note 48: Played in Dublin at Dalymount Park as Sporting Fingal's Morton Stadium did not meet UEFA criteria.

Third qualifying round

Seeding

*Unseeded teams from the second qualifying round that qualified for the third qualifying round, effectively taking the coefficient and seeding of their second qualifying round opponents in this draw.

Matches

|}

Notes
* Note 49: Order of legs reversed after original draw

First leg

Notes
Note 50: Played in Sofia at Vasil Levski National Stadium as CSKA Sofia's Balgarska Armiya Stadium was closed at the end of the previous season because it didn't meet the BFU and UEFA criteria.
Note 51: Played in Novi Sad at Karađorđe Stadium as Spartak Zlatibor Voda's Subotica City Stadium did not meet UEFA criteria.
Note 52: Played in Sofia at Georgi Asparuhov Stadium as Beroe Stara Zagora's Beroe Stadium did not meet UEFA criteria.
Note 53: Played in Prague at Generali Arena as Viktoria Plzeň's Stadion města Plzně did not meet UEFA criteria.
Note 54: Played in Funchal at Estádio da Madeira as Marítimo's Estádio dos Barreiros is undergoing extensive renovative work.

Second leg

Rapid Wien won 4–1 on aggregate.

Elfsborg won 7–1 on aggregate.

Galatasaray won 7–3 on aggregate.

Dnepr Mogilev won 3–1 on aggregate.

Karpaty Lviv won 2–0 on aggregate.

Qarabağ won 4–2 on aggregate.

Dinamo Minsk won 3–2 on aggregate.

Sturm Graz won 3–1 on aggregate.

Anorthosis won 3–2 on aggregate.

2–2 on aggregate. Sibir Novosibirsk won on away goals.

AZ won 2–1 on aggregate.

Dnipro Dnipropetrovsk won 3–2 on aggregate.

Timișoara won 5–4 on aggregate.

Brøndby won 3–1 on aggregate.

Lausanne-Sport won 4–3 on aggregate.

Utrecht won 4–1 on aggregate.

Levski Sofia won 6–3 on aggregate.

Aris won 4–3 on aggregate.

Genk won 8–3 on aggregate.

Beşiktaş won 4–1 on aggregate.

2–2 on aggregate. Maccabi Tel Aviv won on away goals.

APOEL won 4–1 on aggregate.

Marítimo won 10–3 on aggregate.

Slovan Bratislava won 3–2 on aggregate.

Austria Wien won 6–1 on aggregate.

Stuttgart won 5–4 on aggregate.

Hajduk Split won 4–3 on aggregate.

Liverpool won 4–0 on aggregate.

CSKA Sofia won 5–1 on aggregate.

Juventus won 3–0 on aggregate.

Maribor won 6–2 on aggregate.

1–1 on aggregate. Győri ETO won 4–3 on penalties.

Motherwell won 4–1 on aggregate.

Odense won 5–3 on aggregate.

Sporting won 3–1 on aggregate.

Notes
Note 55: Played in Skopje at Philip II Arena as Teteks's City Stadium Tetovo did not meet UEFA criteria.
Note 56: Played in Baku at Tofiq Bahramov Stadium as Qarabağ's Guzanli Olympic Stadium did not meet UEFA criteria.
Note 57: Played in Zürich at Letzigrund as Luzern's Stadion Allmend did not meet UEFA criteria.
Note 58: Played in Wrexham at Racecourse Ground as Bangor City's Farrar Road Stadium did not meet UEFA criteria.
Note 59: Played in Bratislava at Štadión Pasienky as Slovan Bratislava's Tehelné pole is undergoing extensive renovative work.
Note 60: Played in Belfast at Windsor Park as Cliftonville's Solitude did not meet UEFA criteria.
Note 61: Played in Modena at Stadio Alberto Braglia as Juventus's Stadio Olimpico di Torino was to host a U2 360° Tour concert.
Note 62: Match was suspended in the 33rd minute for 20 minutes because of a floodlight failure.

References

External links
2010–11 UEFA Europa League, UEFA.com

Qualifying rounds
UEFA Europa League qualifying rounds